Jerrold Lewis Bock (November 23, 1928November 3, 2010) was an American musical theater composer. He received the Tony Award for Best Musical and the Pulitzer Prize for Drama with Sheldon Harnick for their 1959 musical Fiorello! and the Tony Award for Best Composer and Lyricist for the 1964 musical Fiddler on the Roof with Sheldon Harnick.

Biography
Born into a Jewish family in New Haven, Connecticut, and raised in Flushing, Queens, New York, Bock studied the piano as a child. While a student at the University of Wisconsin–Madison, he wrote the musical Big As Life, which toured the state and enjoyed a run in Chicago. After graduation, he spent three summers at the Tamiment Playhouse in the Poconos and wrote for early television revues with lyricist Larry Holofcener. One of their songs, the three-part "The Story of Alice," was performed by the Chad Mitchell Trio on their Blowin' in the Wind album of 1962.

Career
Bock made his Broadway debut in 1955 when he and Lawrence Holofcener contributed songs to Catch a Star. The following year the duo collaborated on the musical Mr. Wonderful, designed for Sammy Davis Jr., after which they worked on Ziegfeld Follies of 1956, which closed out-of-town.

Shortly after, Bock met lyricist Sheldon Harnick, with whom he forged a successful partnership. Although their first joint venture, The Body Beautiful, failed to charm the critics, its score caught the attention of director George Abbott and producer Hal Prince.  They hired the team to compose a musical biography of former New York City mayor Fiorello La Guardia. Fiorello! (1959) earned Bock and Harnick the New York Drama Critics' Circle Award for Best Musical, Tony Award for Best Musical (tied with the team from The Sound of Music) and the Pulitzer Prize for Drama.

Bock's additional collaborations with Harnick include Tenderloin (1960), Man in the Moon (1963), She Loves Me (1963), Fiddler on the Roof (1964), The Apple Tree (1966), and The Rothschilds (1970), as well as contributions to Never Too Late (1962), Baker Street (1965), Her First Roman (1968), and The Madwoman of Central Park West (1979). Fiddler on the Roof included the hit song "If I Were a Rich Man".

Established in 1997, the Jerry Bock Award for Excellence in Musical Theater is an annual grant presented to the composer and lyricist of a project developed in the BMI Lehman Engel Musical Theater Workshop.

Bock spoke at the funeral of 98-year-old Fiddler playwright Joseph Stein just 10 days before his own death, from heart failure at 81, less than three weeks before his 82nd birthday.

Awards and nominations

References

External links
 

 
Jerry Bock papers in the Music Division of The New York Public Library for the Performing Arts.
PBS biography
Songwriters Hall of Fame biography
TonyAwards.com Interview with Jerry Bock

1928 births
2010 deaths
American musical theatre composers
Broadway composers and lyricists
Flushing High School alumni
Pulitzer Prize for Drama winners
Jewish American composers
Jewish American songwriters
University of Wisconsin–Madison alumni
Grammy Award winners
Musicians from New Rochelle, New York
Emmy Award winners
Tony Award winners
Songwriters from New York (state)
21st-century American Jews